Catocala afghana is a moth in the family Erebidae first described by Charles Swinhoe in 1885. It is found in Pakistan and Afghanistan.

References

afghana
Moths described in 1885
Moths of Asia
Taxa named by Charles Swinhoe